The National Energy Research Scientific Computing Center (NERSC),  is a high-performance computing (supercomputer) National User Facility operated by Lawrence Berkeley National Laboratory for the United States Department of Energy Office of Science. As the mission computing center for the Office of Science, NERSC houses high performance computing and data systems used by 9,000 scientists at national laboratories and universities around the country. NERSC's newest and largest supercomputer is Perlmutter, which debuted in 2021 ranked 5th on the TOP500 list of world's fastest supercomputers.

History
NERSC was founded in 1974 as the Controlled Thermonuclear Research Computer Center, or CTRCC, at Lawrence Livermore National Laboratory. The center was created to provide computing resources to the fusion energy research community, and began with a Control Data Corporation 6600 computer (SN-1). The first machine procured directly by the center was a CDC 7600, installed in 1975 with a peak performance of 36 megaflop/s (36 million floating point operations per second). In 1976, the center was renamed the National Magnetic Fusion Energy Computer Center.

Subsequent supercomputers include a Cray-1 (SN-6), which was installed in May 1978 and called the "c" machine. In 1985, the world's first Cray-2 (SN-1) was installed as the "b" machine. The bubbles visible in the fluid of the Cray-2's direct liquid cooling system earned it the nickname "Bubbles." 

In 1983, the center began providing a small portion of its resources to researchers outside the fusion community. As the center increasingly supported science across many research areas, it changed its name to the National Energy Research Supercomputer Center in 1990.

In 1995, the Department of Energy (DOE) made the decision to move NERSC from LLNL to Lawrence Berkeley National Laboratory. A cluster of Cray J90 systems was installed in Berkeley before the main systems at Livermore were shut down for the move in 1996, thus ensuring continuous support for the research community. As part of the move, the center was renamed the National Energy Research Scientific Computing Center, but kept the NERSC acronym. In 2000, NERSC moved to a new site in Oakland to accommodate the growing footprint of air-cooled supercomputers.

In November 2015, NERSC moved back to the main Berkeley Lab site and is housed in Shyh Wang Hall. As with the move from LLNL, a new system was first installed in Berkeley before the machines in Oakland were taken down and moved.

Computers
To reflect NERSC's mission to support scientific research, the center names its major systems after scientists. The center is located in Shyh Wang Hall, one of the nation's most energy-efficient supercomputer facilities. The building was financed by the University of California which manages Berkeley Lab for the U.S. Department of Energy (DOE). The utility infrastructure and computer systems are provided by DOE.

The newest supercomputer Perlmutter, is named in honor of Saul Perlmutter, an astrophysicist at Berkeley Lab who shared the 2011 Nobel Prize in Physics for his contributions to research showing that the expansion of the universe is accelerating. It is a Cray system based on the Shasta architecture, with Zen 3 based AMD Epyc CPUs ("Milan") and NVIDIA Ampere GPUs.

Another NERSC supercomputer is Cori, named in honor of Gerty Cori, a biochemist who was the first American woman to receive a Nobel Prize in science. Cori is a Cray XC40 system with 622,336 Intel processor cores and a theoretical peak performance of 30 petaflop/s (30 quadrillion operations per second).  Cori was delivered in two phases. The first phase — also known as the Data Partition — was installed in late 2015 and comprises 12 cabinets and more than 1,600 Intel Xeon "Haswell" compute nodes. The second phase of Cori, installed in summer 2016, added another 52 cabinets and more than 9,300 nodes with second-generation Intel Xeon Phi processors (code-named Knights Landing, or KNL for short), making Cori the largest supercomputing system for open science based on KNL processors. 

Other systems at NERSC include:
 A 200+ petabyte High Performance Storage System (HPSS) installation for archival storage. In use since 1998, HPSS is a modern, flexible, performance-oriented mass storage system. NERSC was one of the original developers of HPSS, along with five other DOE labs and IBM.

NERSC facilities are accessible through the Energy Sciences Network, or ESnet, which is also managed by Lawrence Berkeley National Laboratory for the Department of Energy.

Projects
NERSC staff are leading a number of projects in computational science while also helping prepare the broader research community for the exascale era. Examples are:

NESAP: The NERSC Exascale Science Applications Program is a collaborative effort in which NERSC is partnering with code teams and library and tools developers to prepare critical applications to make the most effective use of Cori's manycore architecture. NESAP represents an important opportunity for researchers to prepare application codes for the new architecture and to help advance the missions of the Department of Energy's Office of Science. The NESAP partnership allows 20 projects to collaborate with NERSC, Cray, and Intel by providing access to early hardware, special training and preparation sessions with Intel and Cray staff.  Eight of those 20 will also have an opportunity for a postdoctoral researcher to investigate computational science issues associated with energy-efficient many-core systems.

Shifter: NERSC is working to increase flexibility and usability of its HPC systems by enabling Docker-like Linux container technology. Developed by NERSC staff, Shifter is an open-source software tool based on Docker containers that enables NERSC users to more easily analyze datasets from experimental facilities. Such containers allow an application to be packaged with its entire software stack - including some portions of the base OS files - as well defining needed user environment variables and application "entry point".

HPC4Mfg (High Performance Computing for Manufacturing): NERSC is one of three DOE supercomputing centers working to create an ecosystem that allows experts at DOE's national laboratories to work directly with manufacturing industry members to teach them how to adopt or advance their use of high performance computing (HPC) to address manufacturing challenges with a goal of increasing energy efficiency, reducing environmental impacts and advancing clean energy technologies. The project is led by Lawrence Livermore National Laboratory.

NERSC's user community and scientific impact
In 2022, NERSC supported nearly 9,000 active users from universities, national labs and industry and has users in 50 states, the District of Columbia and Puerto Rico across the U.S., as well as in 45 countries around the world. 

In 2021 NERSC was acknowledged in more than 2,000 refereed scientific journal publications. Six Nobel Prize winning individuals or teams have used NERSC in their research. Research at NERSC is focussed on fundamental and applied research in energy efficiency, storage, and generation; Earth systems science, and understanding of fundamental forces of nature and the universe. The largest research areas are in High Energy Physics, Materials Science, Chemical Sciences, Climate and Environmental Sciences, Nuclear Physics, and Fusion Energy research.

In 2022 NERSC supported researchers from 514 colleges and universities, 26 Department of Energy National Laboratories, 52 organizations in industry, 31 small businesses, 115 other government labs, and 19 non-profit organizations.

References

External links
NERSC main website
NERSC history
ESnet
TOP500 list
Wang Hall opening at NERSCC

Supercomputer sites
Laboratories in California
Lawrence Berkeley National Laboratory
Lawrence Livermore National Laboratory
Science and technology in the San Francisco Bay Area
Organizations based in Oakland, California
Organizations based in Berkeley, California
University and college laboratories in the United States